Elijah Banks Lewis (March 27, 1854 – December 10, 1920) was a U.S. Representative from Georgia.

Born in Coney, Crisp County, Georgia, Lewis attended the common schools of Dooly and Macon Counties, Spalding Seminary, Spalding, Georgia, and a business school in Macon, Georgia.
He moved to Montezuma, Georgia, in 1871 and engaged in banking and mercantile pursuits.
He served as member of the State senate in 1894 and 1895.

Lewis was elected as a Democrat to the Fifty-fifth and to the five succeeding Congresses (March 4, 1897 – March 3, 1909).
He was an unsuccessful candidate for renomination in 1908 to the Sixty-first Congress.
He engaged in his former business activities until his death in Montezuma, Georgia, on December 10, 1920.
He was interred in Felton Cemetery.

References

1854 births
1920 deaths
People from Crisp County, Georgia
American people of Welsh descent
Democratic Party members of the United States House of Representatives from Georgia (U.S. state)
People from Montezuma, Georgia